Alexander Anderson may refer to:

Arts and entertainment
 Alexander Anderson (cartoonist) (1920–2010), American cartoonist, creator of "Rocky the Flying Squirrel"
 Alexander Anderson (illustrator) (1775–1870), American illustrator
 Alexander Anderson (poet) (1845–1909), Scottish poet
 Alexander Anderson (Hellsing), fictional manga character

Politics and law
 Alexander Anderson (Australian politician) (1811–1862), Australian politician and hotelier
 Alexander Anderson (English socialist) (1878–1926), British socialist who helped found the Socialist Party of Great Britain
 Alexander Anderson (Lord Provost of Aberdeen) (1802–1887), Scottish advocate and politician
 Alexander Anderson (Scottish politician) (1888–1954), Scottish politician, MP for Motherwell
 Alexander James Anderson (1863–1946), Canadian politician, barrister, and lawyer
 Alexander O. Anderson (1794–1869), American politician, U.S. senator from Tennessee

Science and medicine
 Alexander Anderson (botanist) (1748–1811), Scottish surgeon and botanist
 Alexander Anderson (mathematician) (c. 1580–1620), Scottish mathematician
 Alexander Anderson (physicist) (1858–1936), Irish physicist and university president
 Alexander P. Anderson (1862–1943), American physiologist, botanist, and breakfast cereal inventor

Others
 Alexander Anderson (footballer) (fl. 1931–1934), Scottish footballer
 Alexander Anderson (minister) (1676–1737), Scottish minister, Moderator of the General Assembly of the Church of Scotland
 Alexander Anderson (Royal Marines officer) (1807–1877), British army general
 Alexander Anderson (rugby union) (1873–1939), Scotland rugby football player
 Alexander Anderson (slave trader) (fl. 1799), British slave trader
 Alexander Caulfield Anderson (1814–1884), Canadian explorer and fur trader
 Alexander Vass Anderson (1895–1963), British army officer

See also
 Alex Anderson (disambiguation)
 Al Anderson (disambiguation)
 Ally Anderson (Alexandra Anderson, born 1996), Australian rules footballer 
 Alexandria Anderson (born 1987), American track and field sprinter
 Robert Alexander Anderson (composer) (1894–1995), American composer
 Alexanderson, surname